Civil Bend, Iowa was a village established in 1850 located in the western part of Benton Township in Fremont County, near the present-day town of Percival on the Missouri River in the U.S. State of Iowa. It was a noted station on the Underground Railroad, and a stop along the Lane Trail.

History 
The village of Civil Bend was established by Abolitionists from Ohio determined to establish a safe haven for freedom seekers from the neighboring slave-friendly states of Missouri, Nebraska, and Kansas, and the southern United States. Formerly enslaved people settled in Civil Bend, too. Sitting in the Missouri River bottoms, the village's proximity to the river became an issue because of repeated flooding.

In the mid-1850s white settlers established a new town on the tablelands to the east of Civil Bend called Tabor. It was an Abolitionist haven and a noted location along the Underground Railroad through the end of the United States Civil War in 1865.

The African Americans who lived in the town stayed there though, along with a few white people.

Notable residents 
 Elmer Ellsworth Beach (1861—1950), American football player and lawyer
 Elvira Gaston Platt, teacher and abolitionist
 Ira Blanchard, Underground Railroad conductor

Present 
Today, the site of Civil Bend is owned by the United States Army Corps of Engineers and is open to the public for outdoor activities.

References

Ghost towns in Iowa
Fremont County, Iowa
Underground Railroad in Iowa
1850 establishments in Iowa
Populated places established in 1850
John Brown sites